Ellen Kushner (born October 6, 1955) is an American writer of fantasy novels. From 1996 until 2010, she was the host of the radio program Sound & Spirit, produced by WGBH in Boston and distributed by Public Radio International.

Background and personal life 
Kushner was born in Washington, D.C. and grew up in Cleveland, Ohio. She attended Bryn Mawr College and graduated from Barnard College. She lives in New York City with her wife and sometime collaborator, Delia Sherman. They held a wedding in 1996 and were legally married in Boston in 2004. Kushner identifies as bisexual.

Career 
Kushner's first books were five Choose Your Own Adventure gamebooks. During that period, she published her first novel, Swordspoint in 1987. A sequel set 18 years after Swordspoint, called The Privilege of the Sword, was published in July 2006, with a first hardcover edition published in late August 2006 by Small Beer Press. The Fall of the Kings (2002) (co-authored by Sherman) is set 40 years after Swordspoint. All three books are considered mannerpunk novels, and take place in a nameless imaginary capital city and its raffish district of Riverside, where swordsmen-for-hire ply their trade.

From 2011 to 2014 audiobook versions of all three novels were produced under the label of Neil Gaiman Presents. The Swordspoint adaptation won the 2013 Audie Award for Best Audio Drama, an Earphones Award from AudioFile, and the 2013 Communicator Award: Gold Award of Excellence (Audio). The adaptation of The Fall of the Kings won the 2014 Wilbur Award.

Kushner's second novel, Thomas the Rhymer, won the World Fantasy Award and the Mythopoeic Award in 1991. She has also published short stories and poetry in various anthologies, including The Year's Best Fantasy and Horror and The Borderland Series of urban fantasy anthologies for teenage readers.

In 1987, Kushner relocated from New York to Boston, and began working as a presenter in radio. She worked with public radio station WBGH-FM, first hosting its all-night radio program "Night Air". In 1989 she hosted the Nakamichi International Music Series for American Public Radio (now Public Radio International), and later produced three Jewish holiday specials with APR, Festival of Liberation: the Passover Story in World Music, The Door is Open: a Jewish High Holiday Meditation, and Beyond 1492.

Beginning in 1996, Kushner wrote, programmed and hosted the series "Sound & Spirit", produced by WGBH/PRI. "Sound & Spirit" was an hour-long weekly series "exploring the human spirit through music and ideas." Episodes featured folk, classical, and world music, with a wide variety of special guests including Grateful Dead drummer Mickey Hart, religious historian Elaine Pagels, and writer Neil Gaiman. "Sound & Spirit" remained on the air until 2010.

In 2002, she released a CD of her story The Golden Dreydl: A Klezmer Nutcracker, which uses music from Pyotr Tchaikovsky's The Nutcracker to tell a Hanukkah story.  The music on the CD is performed by Shirim Klezmer Orchestra. The Golden Dreydl won a Gracie Award from American Women in Radio and Television. A live theater version of The Golden Dreydl was performed in 2008 and 2009 at Vital Theater in New York City, written by Kushner (who played "Tante Miriam" in the 2008 production) and directed by Linda Ames Key.

In 2007, Kushner, along with Elizabeth Schwartz and Yale Strom, scripted the musical audio drama The Witches of Lublin for public radio. Based on the history of Jewish women who were klezmer musicians in 18th Century Europe, The Witches of Lublin premiered on radio stations nationwide in April 2011 with performances by Tovah Feldshuh and Simon Jones. It won the 2012 Wilbur Award for Best Single Program, Radio; the 2012 Grace Allen Award for Best Director, and the 2012 Gabriel Award: Arts, Local Release, Radio.

In 2011 she co-edited (with Holly Black) Welcome to Bordertown, an anthology of new stories from Terri Windling's seminal shared-world series. In an audiobook adaptation Neil Gaiman read his own work, set to an original score by Boiled in Lead's Drew Miller.

In 2015, Kushner created Tremontaine, a serialized prequel to Swordspoint, for the Serial Box platform.  The series ran for four seasons.

With Sherman and others, she is actively involved in the interstitial art movement. She is the co-founder and past president of the Interstitial Arts Foundation.

She is also a member of the Endicott Studio and has taught classes and seminars as part of Hollins University's MFA program; the Odyssey Writing Workshop; and the Clarion Writers' Workshop.

Published works

Riverside 
 Swordspoint (1987) – 
 The Fall of the Kings (with Delia Sherman) (2002) – 
 The Privilege of the Sword (2006) –

Standalone novels 
 Thomas the Rhymer (1990) – 
 St. Nicholas and the Valley Beyond: A Christmas Legend (1994) –

Choose Your Own Adventure books
 47. Outlaws of Sherwood Forest (August, 1985) – 
 56. The Enchanted Kingdom (May, 1986) – 
 58. Statue of Liberty Adventure (July, 1986) – 
 63. Mystery of the Secret Room (December, 1986) – 
 86. Knights of the Round Table (December, 1988) –

Chapbook form 

 The Golden Dreydl (2007) – 
 The Golden Dreidel (2021) – 
 The Man with the Knives (2010), with Thomas Canty –

Short fiction

Anthologies edited 
 Basilisk (1980) – 
 The Horns of Elfland, with Delia Sherman and Donald G. Keller (1997) – 
 Welcome to Bordertown (New Stories and Poems of the Borderlands), with Holly Black (2011) –

Awards

Major awards

Locus awards (poll)

Other awards

References

External links

 
 
 

20th-century American novelists
21st-century American novelists
American fantasy writers
American radio personalities
American women novelists
Barnard College alumni
Bryn Mawr College alumni
Choose Your Own Adventure writers
Living people
Writers from New York City
Women science fiction and fantasy writers
World Fantasy Award-winning writers
Writers from Washington, D.C.
American LGBT novelists
1955 births
20th-century American women writers
21st-century American women writers
Writers from Cleveland
Novelists from New York (state)
Novelists from Ohio
LGBT people from Ohio
LGBT people from Washington, D.C.
Women speculative fiction editors
American bisexual writers